The Bluffton Beavers football program represents Bluffton University in college football as a member of the Heartland Collegiate Athletic Conference (HCAC), affiliated with the NCAA's Division III.  The Beavers' colors are royal purple and white.  The games are played at Dwight Salzman Stadium, which seats over 3,000 spectators. They have produced four professional football players, as Elbert "Golden Wheels" Dubenion played for the Buffalo Bills of the American Football League in the 1960s and Seth Burkholder a 2006 graduate, played for the Pittsburgh Power of the Arena Football League in 2012.  Jordan Burdue and Oscar Vazquez-Dyer 2012 graduates. Jordan played professional arena football for the Evansville Rage(2012) the Marion BlueRacers (2013-2015) the Western Michigan Ironmen (2016) Free Agent Workout with the Minnesota Vikings (2016) and The Biberach Beavers of the German Football League (2016-present). 

Oscar played professional arena football for the Evansville Rage (2012) Marion Blue Racers (2013) And has played in Serbia, Finland and Germany for the last 8 years!

References

External links